Macedonian Volleyball Federation was established in 1946 in the framework of physical culture Association of Macedonia. On 13 February 1949, the Macedonian volleyball federation has become an independent sports organization.

References

Volleyball
North Macedonia